The Mozambique national football team represents Mozambique in men's international football competitions and is controlled by the Mozambican Football Federation, the governing body for football in Mozambique. Mozambique have never qualified for a FIFA World Cup, but they have qualified for four Africa Cup of Nations in 1986, 1996, 1998 and most recently the 2010 Africa Cup of Nations in Angola, being eliminated in the first round in all four.

Mozambique's home ground is Estádio do Zimpeto in the capital city Maputo, and can hold 42,000 spectators. The team's current head coach is Victor Matine, who became manager in July 2019, replacing previous head coach and former Portugal international Abel Xavier, who had been in charge since February 2016.

History

Beginnings

On the day of independence in 1975, Mozambique played its first ever match; a friendly against Zambia, winning 2–1. Two years later, Cuba became Mozambique's first non-African opponent when the two countries met in Mozambique, with Cuba winning 2–0. Mozambique entered World Cup qualifying for the first time in the 1982 qualifying competition. Mozambique were defeated 7–3 over two legs by Zaire in the first round.

1986 Africa Cup of Nations

Mozambique qualified for its first Africa Cup of Nations in 1986. In the qualifying competition they beat Mauritius, Malawi (on penalties), and finally Libya, winning again on penalties.

At the final tournament in Egypt, Mozambique were placed in Group A along with Senegal, Ivory Coast and hosts Egypt. They lost all their games 3–0, 2–0 and 2–0, not scoring a single goal.

1996 Africa Cup of Nations

Mozambique had to wait 10 years to qualify for another Africa Cup of Nations, as they qualified for the 1996 tournament in South Africa. They were placed in Group D along with Ivory Coast, Ghana and Tunisia. Mozambique played their first game against Tunisia in Port Elizabeth, drawing 1–1 with Tico-Tico scoring in the 4th minute. They then went on to lose 1–0 to Ivory Coast and 2–0 to Ghana, thus eliminating them from the tournament.

1998 Africa Cup of Nations

Two years later, Mozambique qualified for their third Africa Cup of Nations held in Burkina Faso. They were again placed in group D along with Morocco, Egypt and Zambia. Mozambique lost their first game against eventual tournament winners Egypt 2–0, both goals coming from Hossam Hassan. In their second game they again lost to Morocco 3–0, therefore eliminating them from the tournament with one game still remaining. In their last game against Zambia, they drew 1–1, their first goal of the tournament. This would prove to be their last African Cup of Nations game for 12 years.

2010 FIFA World Cup qualification

Mozambique entered the 2010 FIFA World Cup qualification in the second round, and were placed in Group 7 with Botswana, Madagascar and African football giants Ivory Coast. They made a terrible start to qualifying, losing to Ivory Coast and minnows Botswana 1–0 and 2–1, and drawing 1–1 with Madagascar. Mozambique then went on to beat Madagascar 3–0 in Antananarivo with goals coming from Tico-Tico, Carlitos and Domingues. They then drew 1–1 with Ivory Coast and beat Botswana 1–0 in Gaborone to qualify for the third Round.

Mozambique were one of the lowest seeded teams in the third round, and were placed in Group B with Nigeria, Tunisia and Kenya. They went on to draw their first game against giants Nigeria 0–0 in Maputo. They then went on to lose their next to games against Tunisia and Kenya 2–0 and 2–1, now making it a struggle to qualify for their first FIFA World Cup. In the next game, they beat Kenya 1–0 with Tico-Tico scoring, but then a loss to Nigeria eliminated them from qualifying. In the last game they beat Tunisia 1–0 in a surprising victory that stopped Tunisia from qualifying. Despite not qualifying for the World Cup, this win was enough to secure third place and qualification for the 2010 Africa Cup of Nations in Angola.

2010 Africa Cup of Nations

After a 12-year absence from Africa Cup of Nations football, Mozambique were placed in Group C with Egypt, Nigeria and Benin. In their first game, they played Benin, drawing 2–2 after being 2–0 down, with goals coming from Miro and Fumo. They then went on to lose 2–0 to eventual tournament winners Egypt and 3–0 to Nigeria, thus eliminating them from the tournament. After the tournament, all-time top scorer and captain Tico-Tico retired from international football.

Recent years

Mozambique have yet to reach a fifth AFCON Finals despite several close misses. During the 2013 qualifiers, they reached the final round and beat Morocco 2–0 in the first leg in Maputo. However, they were beaten 4–0 in Marrakech four days later. During the 2019 qualifiers the Mambas were only denied by a Guinea-Bissau equaliser in stoppage time at the end of their final Group K match.

Recent results and fixtures

2022

2023

Coaching history

 Cremildo Loforte (1980)
 Manaca (1986)
 José Geneto (1986)
 Viktor Bondarenko (1993–1995)
 Rui Caçador (1996)
 Arnaldo Salvado (1996–1998)
 Euroflim da Graça (1999)
 Arnaldo Salvado (1999–2000)
 Augusto Matine (2001–2002)
 Viktor Bondarenko (2003)
 Artur Semedo (2003–2006)
 Mart Nooij (2007–2011)
 Gert Engels (2011–2013)
 João Chissano (2013–2015)
 Hélder Muianga (2015)
 Boris Pušić (2015)
 Abel Xavier (2016–2019)
 Victor Matine (2019)
 Luís Gonçalves (2019–2021)
 Horácio Gonçalves (2021)
 Chiquinho Conde (2021-presente)

Players

Current squad
 The following players were called up for the friendly matches.
 Match dates: 17 November 2022
 Opposition: Caps and goals correct as of: 8 June 2022, after the match against .

Recent call-ups
The following players have been called up for Mozambique in the last 12 months.

DEC Player refused to join the team after the call-up.INJ Player withdrew from the squad due to an injury.
PRE Preliminary squad.RET Player has retired from international football.
SUS Suspended from the national team.

RecordsPlayers in bold are still active with Mozambique.''

Most capped players

Top goalscorers

Competitive record
FIFA World Cup

Africa Cup of Nations

African Nations Championship

COSAFA Cup

HonoursCOSAFA Cup: 2'''
2008, 2015 (Runners-up)

References

External links

 Federação Moçambicana de Futebol 
 Mozambique at FIFA.com
 Mozambique at CAF Online
 National football team picture

 
African national association football teams
National sports teams established in 1975
1975 establishments in Mozambique
Basketball teams established in 1975